The Sticky Side of Baklava is a Quebec film recounting the story of a clash between Lebanese and Quebec cultures, as played out in the relationship between two sisters. It features Jean-Nicolas Verreault, Claudia Ferri, Raïa Haïdar and Geneviève Brouillette.

Plot 
The Sticky Side of Baklava takes a comedic look at cultural difference, as experienced by two sisters who leave Lebanon to settle in Montreal. Houwayda embraces the lifestyle and values of her new home, while Joelle holds onto her Lebanese traditions. When faced with an important life choice that will affect the people around her, Houwada questions the values of her past as well as her present.

Cast

Festivals 

 World premiere at the Cinemania Film Festival
 Durban International Film Festival

References

External links 

 

2020 films
Canadian comedy films
Quebec films
2020s French-language films
Films set in Montreal
Films shot in Montreal
French-language Canadian films
2020s Canadian films